Le violoncelliste is an oil painting by Paul Gauguin which is kept in the Baltimore Museum of Art.

Paul Gauguin painted Fritz Schneklud, a friend and professional musician, in 1894.

References

Paintings by Paul Gauguin
1894 paintings
Musical instruments in art
Paintings in the collection of the Baltimore Museum of Art